Kelsey The First Benjamin (born 8 May 1999) is a Guyanese professional footballer who plays as a midfielder for GFF Elite League club Guyana Defence Force and the Guyana national team.

International career 
Benjamin represents Guyana at international level. His first goal with the national team came in a 3–1 loss to Suriname on 16 March 2019.

International goals 
 Guyana score listed first, score column indicates score after the Benjamin goal.

References

External links 
 

1999 births
Living people
Sportspeople from Georgetown, Guyana
Guyanese footballers
Association football midfielders
Buxton United FC players
Georgetown FC players
Morvant Caledonia United players
Western Tigers FC players
Guyana Defence Force FC players
TT Pro League players
Guyanese expatriate footballers
Expatriate footballers in Trinidad and Tobago
Guyanese expatriate sportspeople in Trinidad and Tobago
Guyana international footballers
Guyana under-20 international footballers